The Church Temporalities Act 1833 (3 & 4 Will. 4 c. 37), sometimes called the Church Temporalities (Ireland) Act 1833, was an Act of the Parliament of the United Kingdom of Great Britain and Ireland which undertook a major reorganisation of the Church of Ireland, then the established church in Ireland. The Act suppressed ten bishoprics and merged the corresponding dioceses, with effect from the next vacancy.

Provisions
The Act provided for merging of dioceses and provinces of the Church of Ireland, and the elimination of Vestry Assessment (church rates or "parish cess"), a cause of grievance in the Tithe War, although disturbance persisted until the Tithe Commutation Act 1838.

Footnotes

Sources

References

External links
 

Church of Ireland
Acts of the Parliament of the United Kingdom concerning Ireland
1833 in British law
1833 in Ireland
Tithe War